The 2nd Crystal Palace Trophy was a motor race, run to Formula One rules, held on 19 June 1954 at Crystal Palace Circuit, London. The race was run over two heats of 10 laps and a final of 10 laps.

Reg Parnell in a Ferrari 500 won Heat 1 and set fastest lap in that heat. Peter Collins in a Connaught Type A-Lea Francis started from pole position in Heat 1.

Rodney Nuckey in a Cooper T23-Bristol won Heat 2 and set fastest lap in that heat. Don Beauman in a Connaught Type A-Lea Francis started from pole position in Heat 2.

Parnell won the final, starting from pole by way of being fastest winner in the heats, and set fastest lap. Collins was second and Nuckey third.

Entries

1DNA
2Fairman raced Webb's car

Results

Heats

Final
Grid positions for the final were determined by the drivers' finishing times in the heats. Only the top six drivers from each heat qualified for the final.

References 

Crystal Palace